Gedächtniskirche (German for "Memorial Church") may refer to several different churches, among them:

 Kaiser-Friedrich-Gedächtniskirche (also known in English as Emperor Frederick Memorial Church) in Berlin 
 Kaiser-Wilhelm-Gedächtniskirche (also known in English as Kaiser Wilhelm Memorial Church) in Berlin.
 Gedächtniskirche der Protestation (Memorial Church of the Protestation) in Speyer.
  in Leipzig-Schönefeld,